Oscar Johansson may refer to:

 Oscar Johansson (ice hockey) (born 1988), Swedish ice hockey winger
 Oscar Johansson (politician) (1882–1947), Finnish lawyer, civil servant and politician
 Oscar Johansson (footballer) (born 1995), Swedish footballer

See also
 Oskar Johansson (born 1977), Canadian sailor
 Oskar Johansson (footballer) (born 1990), Swedish footballer